The 1998 Norwich City Council election took place on 7 May 1998 to elect members of Norwich City Council in England. This was on the same day as other local elections. 16 of 48 seats (one-third) were up for election, with two additional seats up in Catton Grove and University wards due to by-elections.

Results summary

Ward results

Bowthorpe

Catton Grove

Coslany

Crome

Eaton

Heigham

Henderson

Lakenham

Mancroft

Mile Cross

Mousehold

Nelson

St. Stephen

Thorpe Hamlet

Town Close

University

References

1998 English local elections
1998
1990s in Norfolk
May 1998 events in the United Kingdom